The Henry T. Sloane House is a mansion located at 9 East 72nd Street on the Upper East Side of the borough of Manhattan, New York City. It was designed by Carrère and Hastings in the late Rococo style and built in 1894.

History
It was originally constructed for Henry T. Sloane, son of a founder of the carpet firm W. & J. Sloane. Starting in 1964, it housed the Lycée Français de New York, along with its extensions in the neighboring Oliver Gould Jennings House.

The mansion was in turn vacated by the school when it was sold and renovated to become a luxurious single-family home again. The purchaser of the building was Hamad bin Khalifa Al Thani, the (now former) Emir of Qatar, who bought the mansion and the neighboring Oliver Gould Jennings House around 2004.

References

Further reading

External links

Upper East Side
Houses in Manhattan
New York City Designated Landmarks in Manhattan
Gilded Age mansions